is a Japanese professional baseball player for the Tohoku Rakuten Golden Eagles. He previously played for the Chiba Lotte Marines of the Nippon Professional Baseball (NPB).

On November 18, 2019, Suzuki signed with the Tohoku Rakuten Golden Eagles.

References

External links

 NPB.com

1989 births
Living people
Chiba Lotte Marines players
Japanese baseball players
Nippon Professional Baseball infielders
Baseball people from Shizuoka Prefecture
Tohoku Rakuten Golden Eagles players
Toyo University alumni